

This is a timeline of Chinese history, comprising important legal and territorial changes and political events in China and its predecessor states. To read about the background to these events, see History of China. See also the list of Chinese monarchs, Chinese emperors family tree, dynasties in Chinese history and years in China.

Dates prior to 841 BC, the beginning of the Gonghe Regency, are provisional and subject to dispute.

Prehistory / Millennia: 3rd BC2nd BC–1st BC1st–2nd3rdSee alsoFurther readingExternal links

Prehistoric China

Antiquity

22nd century BC

21st century BC 

Centuries: 20th BC19th BC18th BC17th BC16th BC15th BC14th BC13th BC12th BC11th BC10th BC9th BC8th BC7th BC6th BC5th BC4th BC3rd BC2nd BC1st BC

20th century BC

19th century BC

18th century BC

17th century BC

16th century BC

15th century BC

13th century BC

12th century BC

11th century BC

10th century BC

9th century BC

8th century BC

7th century BC

6th century BC

5th century BC

4th century BC

3rd century BC

2nd century BC

1st century BC 

Centuries: 1st2nd3rd4th5th6th7th8th9th10th11th12th13th14th15th16th17th18th19th20th

1st century

2nd century

3rd century

4th century

5th century

6th century

7th century

8th century

9th century

10th century

11th century

12th century

13th century

14th century

15th century

16th century

17th century

18th century

19th century

20th century

21st century

Timeline of Chinese dynasties

See also
 History of China 
Cities in China
 Timeline of Fuzhou
 Timeline of Guangzhou
 Timeline of Hangzhou
 Timeline of Nanjing
 Timeline of Shanghai
 Timeline of Hong Kong history
Related
 Timeline of Taiwanese history
 Timeline of Tibetan history

References

Further reading

Published in the 19th century
 
 

Published in the 20th century
 
 

Published in the 21st century

External links
 
 Chinese History and Dynasties
 
 
 

Years in China
Chinese